Smith Airport may refer to:

 Lawrence Smith Memorial Airport serving Harrisonville, Missouri, United States (FAA: LRY)
 Lubbock Preston Smith International Airport serving Lubbock, Texas, United States (FAA: LBB)
 Merle K. (Mudhole) Smith Airport serving Cordova, Alaska, United States (FAA: CDV)
 Michael J. Smith Field serving Beaufort, North Carolina, United States (FAA: MRH)
 Smith Field (Arkansas) serving Siloam Springs, Arkansas, United States (FAA: SLG)
 Smith Field (Indiana) serving Fort Wayne, Indiana, United States (FAA: SMD)

See also
 Smith Field (disambiguation)